Cheyenne's Pal is a 1917 American silent Western film directed by John Ford and featuring Harry Carey. The film is considered to be lost.

Plot
As described in a film magazine, Noisy Jim (Corey), a British officer, is anxious to purchase Cactus Peter, the horse belonging to Cheyenne Harry (Carey), but Harry refuses to sell. Harry meets Flora Belle (Astor) one night at the dance hall. Since its pay day, Harry spends all of his money on her, and when he runs out she looks around for someone else who still has money to spend.

Angered, Harry goes out, sells Cactus Pete, and returns with more money. When he awakens the next day from his drunken stupor and realizes what he has done, he is consumed with regret and goes to recover his horse. He steals his horse, but is ordered shot for the act. When the fatal hour nears, the British officer relents and Harry is allowed to go free.

Cast
 Gertrude Astor as Girl from dancing hall
 Harry Carey as Cheyenne Harry
 Pete Carey as Cactus Pete the Horse
 Jim Corey as Noisy Jim
 Hoot Gibson as Cowboy
 Ed Jones as Cowboy
 Vester Pegg as Cowboy
 Steve Pimento as Cowboy
 William Steele (credited as Bill Gettinger) as Cowboy

Production
Filming took place over a three-day period (May 23–25, 1917) under the working titles Cactus My Pal and The Dumb Friend. The finished film was released by Universal Studios as a 20-minute silent film on two reels. The film is part of the "Cheyenne Harry" series of film featurettes, and was initially released as a promotional tool for the sale of American war bonds during World War I.

See also
 John Ford filmography
 Harry Carey filmography
 Hoot Gibson filmography
 List of American films of 1917
 List of lost films

References

External links
 

1917 films
1917 Western (genre) films
1917 short films
1917 lost films
American silent short films
American black-and-white films
Films directed by John Ford
Lost Western (genre) films
Lost American films
Universal Pictures short films
Silent American Western (genre) films
1910s American films